Yameen-ud Daula Saadat Ali Khan II Bahadur (bf. 1752 – c. 11 July 1814) was the sixth Nawab of Oudh from 21 January 1798 to 11 July 1814, and the son of Shuja-ud-Daula. He was of Persian origin.

Life
He was the second son of Nawab Shuja-ud-daula. Saadat Ali Khan succeeded his half-nephew, Mirza Wazir `Ali Khan, to the throne of Oudh in 1798. Saadat Ali Khan was crowned on 21 January 1798 at Bibiyapur Palace in Lucknow, by Sir John Shore.

In 18, the British concluded a treaty with him, by which half of his dominions were ceded to the East India Company, in return for perpetual British protection of Oudh, from all internal and external disturbances and threats (the British were to later renege on this promise). The districts ceded (then yielding a total revenue of 1 Crore & 35 Lakhs of Rupees) are as under:

• Etawa

• Kora

• Kurra

• Rehur

• Farruckabad

• Khyreegurh

• Mounal

• Kunchunpore

• Azimgarh

• Benjun

• Goruckpore

• Botwul

• Allahabad

• Bareilly

• Moradabad

• Bijnore

• Budown

• hilibheet

• Shahjehanpore

• Nawabgunge

• Rehlee

• Mohowl (less Jaulluk Arwu)

Following the cessation, he reduced the Oudh Army from 80,000 to 30,000 men.

He had three sons, Ghazi ad-Din Haydar, Shams-ud-daula, and Nasser-ud-daula. His son Ghazi ad-Din succeeded him, and later his grandson, Nasser ad-Din Haydar. After that, his son Nasser-ud-daula succeeded the throne, whilst his grandson, Iqbal-ud-daula, son of Shams-ud-daula, made claims to the throne in 1838. It is important to note that Saadat Ali Khan preferred his son Shams-ud-daula and desired to proclaim his heir, but was prevented by British interference.

Most of the buildings between the Kaiserbagh and Dilkusha were constructed by him. He had a palace called Dilkusha Kothi designed and built by Sir Gore Ouseley in 1805.

Death
Nawab Saadat Ali Khan died in 1814 and he was buried with his wife Khursheed Zadi at Qaisar Bagh.

Gallery

See also
 Tafazzul Husain Khan
 Mirza Abu Taleb Khan

References

Notes

External links
 National Informatics Centre, Lucknow - Rulers of Awadh

People from Lucknow
Nawabs of Awadh
1752 births
1814 deaths
Mughal Empire
18th-century Iranian people
19th-century Iranian people